Novozhilov is a Russian masculine surname, its feminine counterpart is Novozhilova. It may refer to:
Genrikh Novozhilov (1925–2019), Soviet and Russian aircraft designer
Nestor Ivanovich Novozhilov, Soviet palaeontologist
Viktor Novozhilov (1950–1991), Soviet and Russian Olympic wrestler
Viktor Valentinovich Novozhilov (1892–1970), Soviet economist and mathematician

See also
Novozhilova, a rural locality in Kudymkarsky District, Perm Krai
Novozhilovo, name of three localities in Russia

Russian-language surnames